Compute!, often stylized as COMPUTE!, was an American home computer magazine that was published from 1979 to 1994. Its origins can be traced to 1978 in Len Lindsay's PET Gazette,  one of the first magazines for the Commodore PET computer. In its 1980s heyday, Compute! covered all major platforms, and several single-platform spinoffs of the magazine were launched. The most successful of these was Compute!'s Gazette, which catered to VIC-20 and Commodore 64 computer users.

History
Compute!s original goal was to write about and publish programs for all of the computers that used some version of the MOS Technology 6502 CPU. It started out in 1979 with the Commodore PET, VIC-20, Atari 400/800, Apple II+, and some 6502-based computers one could build from kits, such as the Rockwell AIM 65, the KIM-1 by MOS Technology, and others from companies such as Ohio Scientific. Coverage of the kit computers and the Commodore PET were eventually dropped. The platforms that became mainstays at the magazine were the Commodore 64, VIC-20, Atari 8-bit family, TI-99/4A, and the Apple II. Later on the 6502 platform focus was dropped and IBM PC, Atari ST, and the Amiga computers were added to its line-up. It also published a successful line of computer books, many of which consisted of compilations of articles from the magazine.

ABC Publishing acquired Compute! Publications in May 1983 for $18 million in stock, and raised circulation of the magazine from 200,000 to 420,000 by the end of the year. Compute!'s Gazette, for Commodore computers, began publishing that year. Compute! claimed in 1983 that it published more type-in programs "in each issue than any magazine in the industry". A typical issue would feature a large-scale program for one of the covered platforms, with smaller programs for one or more platforms filling the remainder of the issue's type-ins. Most personal computers of the time came with some version of the BASIC programming language. Machine code programs were also published, usually for simple video games listed in BASIC DATA statements as hexadecimal numbers that could be POKEd into the memory of a home computer by a 'stub' loader at the beginning of the program. Machine language listings could be entered with a program provided in each issue called MLX (available for Apple II, Atari and Commodore hardware, and written in BASIC). Early versions of MLX accepted input in decimal, but this was later changed to the more compact hexadecimal format. It was noted particularly for software such as the multiplatform word processor SpeedScript, the spreadsheet SpeedCalc, and the game Laser Chess.

Editors of the magazine included Robert Lock, Richard Mansfield, Charles Brannon, and Tom R. Halfhill. Noted columnists included Jim Butterfield, educator Fred D'Ignazio and science fiction author Orson Scott Card.

With the May 1988 issue, the magazine was redesigned and the type-in program listings were dropped, as was coverage of the Atari 8-bit computers. In 1990, Compute! was out of publication for several months when it was sold to General Media, publishers at the time of Omni and Penthouse magazines, in May of that year. General Media changed the title of the magazine to COMPUTE, without the exclamation point, and the cover design was changed to resemble that of OMNI magazine. Ziff Davis bought Compute!s assets, including its subscriber list, in 1994. General Media had ceased its publication before the sale.

Former employees
Len Lindsay: Lindsay went on to found the COMAL User's Group, which promoted the COMAL programming language in North America.

Robert Lock: After Compute! Publications, Lock started another company, Signal Research, which was among the first to publish magazines and books about computer games. Among the biggest magazine published by Signal Research was Game Players, a magazine devoted to Nintendo, PC, and Sega gaming. He also wrote the book The Traditional Potters of Seagrove, N.C. in 1994, and started Southern Arts Journal a quarterly magazine featuring essays, fiction and poetry about all things Southern, in 2005, but ceased publication after only four issues the next year.

Richard Mansfield: Mansfield has written many books, mostly on Microsoft technologies, including Visual Basic .NET All in One Desk Reference for Dummies, Visual Basic .NET Power Tools, Office 2003 Application Development All-in-One Desk Reference For Dummies, Visual Basic 2005 Express Edition For Dummies, and CSS Web Design For Dummies. He also writes occasional pieces for DevX.com. He created much controversy with an article he wrote there called OOP is Much Better in Theory Than in Practice.

Tom R. Halfhill: Halfhill went on to become a senior editor at Byte. He is currently a technology analyst at The Linley Group and a senior editor of Microprocessor Report.

David D. Thornburg: Thornburg has continued to work in the field of educational technology and is involved in projects both in the US and Brazil.

Charles G. Brannon: Moved to the San Francisco Bay Area to work as a Project Manager for Epyx, before moving back to Greensboro and working for his father's insurance wholesaler company Group US as an Information Technology Manager. He has retired as of 2016.

References

External links
 
 Compute! at The Classic Computer Magazine Archive website
 Compute! at Electronic Archives website
 Compute! at DLH's Commodore Archive website

Defunct computer magazines published in the United States
Apple II periodicals
Atari 8-bit computer magazines
Commodore 8-bit computer magazines
Home computer magazines
Magazines established in 1979
Magazines disestablished in 1994
Monthly magazines published in the United States
Magazines published in New York City